Colin Fowler (born 3 August 1962, in Northfield, Birmingham) is a former English professional darts player. Father to 3 and his favourite being his oldest Marky Fowler who is a legend in his own right.

Career
Fowler reached the quarter-finals of a PDC event for the first time in his career at the opening UK Open Qualifier of 2013, where he lost 6–3 against Ronnie Baxter. He made his debut in the UK Open later in the year and was beaten 5–4 by Matt Padgett in the second round. In April 2014, Fowler won two Challenge Tour tournaments on the same day, winning a total of 14 consecutive matches and amassing £4,000 in prize money. He beat Mark Frost and Matt Clark in the two finals. Fowler also won the 15th event with a 6–3 victory over Dirk van Duijvenbode and finished third on the Challenge Tour Order of Merit, just £300 short of second place which would have seen him earn a two-year PDC tour card.

Fowler defeated Steve West 5–0 and Jason Wilson 5–3 at the 2015 UK Open, before losing 9–4 to David Pallett in the third round. He took the second Challenge Tour event of the year by beating Steve Maish 5–2. Fowler lost 5–3 to Rob Modra in the semi-finals of the second Challenge Tour of 2016. He only progressed to the last 16 once in the remaining 16 tournaments of the year.

References

External links

Living people
Professional Darts Corporation associate players
English darts players
1962 births
Place of birth missing (living people)
Sportspeople from Birmingham, West Midlands